Torta Tre Monti (from ) is a traditional Sammarinese cake made of layers of thin waffled wafers cemented together by chocolate or hazelnut crème. The final product is covered in chocolate fondant. It is similar to other layered desserts common to San Marino, this one being representative of the Three Towers of San Marino.

In San Marino, the torta has been commercially produced by La Serenissima since 1942. The bakery markets both a full-size cake and snack-size version, in addition to a variation that includes coffee.

See also
 List of cakes
 List of Italian desserts and pastries

References

External links
 La Serenissima home page
 Production  process video

Cakes
Sammarinese cuisine
Chocolate desserts
National dishes
Italian cakes